Ehrhart is a surname. Notable people with the surname include:
 Eugène Ehrhart (1906–2000), French mathematician who introduced Ehrhart polynomials in the 1960s
 Gustav Ehrhart (1894–1971), German chemist who synthesized the first fully synthetic opioid analgesic, methadone
 Jakob Friedrich Ehrhart (1742–1795), German botanist for whom a genus of grasses, Ehrharta, is named

See also
 Ehrhart Neubert (born 1940), a retired German Evangelical minister and theologian
 Erhard
 Ehrhardt
 Erhardt

Surnames from given names
German-language surnames

de:Ehrhart